No Thanks! The '70s Punk Rebellion is a compilation album chronicling the punk rock movement of the 1970s. Released by Rhino Entertainment on October 28, 2003, the box set of four compact discs includes 100 tracks originally released between 1973 and 1980, performed by 75 artists from the United States, United Kingdom, Australia, and Ireland. In addition to punk rock, the collection touches upon the antecedent style of proto-punk and the related genres of new wave music, power pop, and post-punk.

Many artists are represented multiple times in the collection. The Buzzcocks have the most tracks of any single artist, with three of their songs included in the compilation. Johnny Thunders appears on five tracks: two by the New York Dolls, two by The Heartbreakers, and his 1978 solo song "You Can't Put Your Arms Around a Memory". Notably absent from the compilation are the Sex Pistols, whose singer John Lydon refused Rhino Entertainment permission to include any of the band's tracks, allegedly because Rhino chose not to release the 2002 Sex Pistols boxed set in the United States.

Track listing

Credits

 Co-producer [Associate Producer] – Alec Palao 
 Compilation Producer [Box Set Produced by] – Gary Stewart 
 Liner Notes [Discographical Annotations] – Reggie Collins 
 Management [Product] – Emily Cagan, Marc Salata 
 Other [Licensing] – John Austin 
 Producer [Sound Produced by] – Bill Inglot
 Remastered by – Bill Inglot, Dan Hersch, Dave Schultz 
 Research [Editorial] – Steven Chean 
 Research [Photo] – Steven P. Gorman 
 Supervised by [Editorial Supervision] – Sheryl Farber 
 Supervised by [Project Supervision] – Patrick Milligan

References

Punk rock compilation albums
2003 compilation albums
Rhino Records compilation albums
New wave compilation albums
Power pop compilation albums
Post-punk compilation albums
Protopunk compilation albums